HMS Electra was a 16-gun brig-sloop. She was built by the Enterprise Ethéart, Saint-Malo, as the French Curieux-class brig Espiègle and launched in 1804. She was armed in 1807 at Saint Servan. The British frigate Sybille captured her on 16 August 1808. Electra captured one American privateer before she was sold in 1816.

French service
The three ships were sailing across the Bay of Biscay en route to Martinique to deliver supplies when they encountered , under Captain Cuthbert Featherstone Daly, on 17 August. Comet soon captured Sylphe but the other two escaped. The next day Captain Clotworthy Upton in Sybille captured Espiègle. Diligente, though, escaped.

British service
Electra was only commissioned in February 1812 under Commander William Gregory and spent most of her brief career escorting convoys to and from Newfoundland. She sailed for Newfoundland both on 27 April 1812 and on 17 March 1813. She did make one capture.

On 7 July 1813 Electra captured a U.S. privateer near Newfoundland after a six-hour chase. She was the schooner Growler, pierced for 14 guns but carrying only one long 24-pounder gun and four 18-pounder guns. She had a crew of 60 men.  Growler, under Captain N. Lindsey, had had a relatively successful cruise having taken the ship Arabella, a brig, the schooner Prince of Wales, and the brig Ann.

Commander Thomas Walbeoff Cecil took command in June 1814, but died of yellow fever in October in the West Indies. Cecil died of yellow fever at Port Royal on 24 October 1814.

Fate
Cecil's replacement, Commander Richard Lewin, paid Electra off in 1815. On 17 June 1816 the Commissioners of the Navy offered her for sale at Deptford. She was sold there for £800 on 11 July 1816.

Notes, citations, and references
Notes

Citations

References

External links
 Phillips, Michael: Ships of the Old Navy - HMS Electra

1804 ships
Brigs of the French Navy
Brigs of the Royal Navy
Captured ships